Winterbourne United Football Club is a football club based in Winterbourne, near Bristol, England.

History
Winterbourne United Football Club, formerly known as Winterbourne Wasps until the outbreak of the First World War, was formed in 1911, the first club secretary being Fred Tolley.

The Club entered the Bristol and Suburban League and enjoyed one of the most successful periods in their history. They finished as runners up in the league no less than four times during the 1930s and in the 1933–34 season reached the semi-finals of the G.F A Senior Amateur Cup, losing to Victoria Albion at the Douglas Ground, Kingswood. In the home quarter final against Dockland Settlement over 2000 paid to watch the game.

During the Second World War, the local Home Guard kept football going in the village until peacetime.

In 1950–51, the Club joined the Bristol & District League and were relegated in their first season. A period of rebuilding followed which took longer than anticipated as there were a limited number of players in the villages of Winterbourne, Watleys End and Frampton Cotterell. However the rebuilding both of the team and the changing rooms paid dividends and season 1967–68 saw the Club move into senior football as it won the Bristol & District League Division One Championship and the G.F.A Intermediate Cup, along with the Berkeley Hospital Senior Cup.

This success brought promotion to the Bristol Premier Combination and three years later, 1970–71, the Club won the Second Division Championship and the Cossham Hospital Premier Cup.

Winterbourne continued membership of the County of Avon Premier Combination until their most successful season, 1991–92, winning the Premier Combination Cup, and finished runners up to Hlghridge United in the Premier Division. As a result, the Club gained promotion to the Gloucestershire County League for the first time.
During that season strength of the club was evident as the Reserves team won the Bristol & District League First Division title and also carried off both the Premier and Senior Berkeley Hospital Cups.

A poor season in 1995–96 saw the Club relegated from the Gloucestershire County League back to the Bristol Premier Combination despite reaching the G.F.A. Challenge Trophy semi-finals for the first time. The slump did not last long as just one year later the Club marched back into the County League by winning the 'double'.
After beating Highridge United 2–1 in the final to win the G.F.A. Senior Amateur Cup, they clinched promotion by winning the Premier Combination championship by 7 clear points from their nearest rivals Hambrook.

In season 1998–99 the Reserves won the Bristol & District League Senior Division to gain promotion to the Premier Combination and two years later in 2000/2001 the first team finished as Champions of the Gloucestershire County League to gain promotion to the Hellenic League.

In season 2005–06 saw the club's most successful season when they won the Hellenic League Div1 West losing just 5 out of their 34 games and scoring 98 goals.

Winterbourne also has a successful 'A' team in Division 3 of the Bristol and District League consisting of the younger element bonded together by a few experienced old stagers. In more recent years the club has benefited from its successful youth policy.

In November 2009, Nick Tanner was appointed manager. On 18 November 2009 it was confirmed that former Liverpool goalkeeper and colleague of Tanner, Bruce Grobbelaar had agreed to play in a one-off cup tie against local rivals Patchway in a Gloucestershire FA County Cup match on 5 December. Eventually Grobbelaar did not play the game although he attended at the club's Parkside Avenue ground. Grobbelaar took part in a half-time penalty shootout competition. Winterbourne lost the game to Patchway 1–0. In August 2011, Tanner resigned from his position as manager of the club.

For the 2012–13 season the club was transferred to the Western League Premier Division. However, they resigned from the league midway through the 2015–16 season, with the reserves in the Premier Division of the Bristol Premier Combination becoming the first team.

Honours
Hellenic Football League Division One West
Champions 2005–06, 2007–08
Gloucestershire County League
Champions 2000–01

Records
FA Vase
Second Round 2011–12

References

External links

Hellenic Football League
Football clubs in Gloucestershire
Association football clubs established in 1911
1911 establishments in England
Western Football League
Civil Parish of Winterbourne
Football clubs in England
Bristol and District Football League
Bristol Premier Combination